Erpetogomphus compositus, the white-belted ringtail, is a species of clubtail in the family of dragonflies known as Gomphidae. It is found in Central America and North America.

The IUCN conservation status of Erpetogomphus compositus is "LC", least concern, with no immediate threat to the species' survival. The population is stable.

References

Further reading

External links

 

Gomphidae
Articles created by Qbugbot
Insects described in 1858
Odonata of North America
Insects of Central America